Favorite Hawaiian Songs is a compilation album of phonograph records by Bing Crosby released in 1940 featuring songs that were sung in a Hawaiian-type genre. This is the second album release of many of Crosby's Hawaiian hits such as: Blue Hawaii and Sweet Leilani.

Release history
This is not to be confused with the later albums of the same name. Crosby recorded four more Hawaiian songs and Dick McIntire's Harmony Hawaiians recorded two more after this album's release, and Decca had still not used "Paradise Isle" and "Aloha Kuu Ipo Aloha", stamped on Decca 3797, in an album yet - so, this album, consisting of twelve songs - along with those eight more unused songs, (a combined total of twenty songs on ten 78 rpm records) was split into two 5-disc (10 song) 78 rpm albums of the same name- Volume One and Volume Two.

Track listing
These re-issued songs were featured on a 6-disc, 78 rpm album set, Decca Album No. 140.

References

Bing Crosby compilation albums
1940 compilation albums
Decca Records compilation albums
Hawaiian music